Anne Baxter (1923–1985) was an American actress who had an extensive career in film, television and on stage. She made her acting debut at the age of 13 on stage in the Broadway play Seen But Not Heard in 1936. Four years later, Baxter starred in her first feature film, the western 20 Mule Team (1940). She appeared in Orson Welles' period drama The Magnificent Ambersons (1942) with Joseph Cotten and Dolores Costello, and followed this with a lead role in Billy Wilder's Five Graves to Cairo (1943). In 1946, she starred as a woman suffering from alcoholism in the drama The Razor's Edge, for which Baxter won the Academy Award for Best Supporting Actress. Two years later, Baxter appeared with Gregory Peck in the western Yellow Sky.

For her performance as Eve Harrington, an ambitious understudy, in Joseph L. Mankiewicz's All About Eve (1950), she received a nomination for the Academy Award for Best Actress. Three years later, Baxter starred in Alfred Hitchcock's film noir I Confess (1953). In the same year she also appeared in the Fritz Lang-directed film noir The Blue Gardenia. In 1956, Baxter appeared as Egyptian princess Nefretiri in the Cecil B. DeMille-directed biblical epic The Ten Commandments with Charlton Heston and Yul Brynner. Four years later, she received a star on the Hollywood Walk of Fame.

Her television debut was in the anthology series General Electric Theater in 1957. She went on to star in several anthology series including The United States Steel Hour, The Alfred Hitchcock Hour, and The DuPont Show with June Allyson. During the late 1960s, Baxter played two villains in the Batman television series, and in 1969 was nominated for the Primetime Emmy Award for Outstanding Lead Actress in a Limited Series or Movie for her role in The Name of the Game.

In 1971, Baxter made a return to Broadway theatre by starring as Margo Channing in Applause, a musical adaptation of All About Eve. Her last acting role was in the television series Hotel where she starred as hotelier Victoria Cabot.

Film

Television

Stage

Notes

References

External links
 

Actress filmographies
American filmographies